Ivars Zdanovskis (born 8 June 1965) is a Latvian weightlifter. He competed in the men's heavyweight I event at the 1996 Summer Olympics.

References

1965 births
Living people
Latvian male weightlifters
Olympic weightlifters of Latvia
Weightlifters at the 1996 Summer Olympics
Sportspeople from Riga
20th-century Latvian people